William Preston (August 26, 1921 – July 10, 1998) was an American actor. He did not start his acting career until he was at the age of 47 but subsequently appeared in more than sixty productions of Shakespeare's plays. He had a Master's degree in English literature from Penn State. He is perhaps best known for his role as recurring character Carl "Oldie" Olsen on Late Night with Conan O'Brien. Among his many movie roles, he played John, the bum, from The Fisher King (1991), a blacksmith in Far and Away (1992), and the flask mourner in Family Business (1989). He later appeared in Waterworld (1995), Reckless (1995), Blue in the Face (1995), and The Crucible (1996).

He died at Saint Vincent's Hospital in Manhattan on July 10, 1998.

Filmography

References

External links
 

1921 births
1998 deaths
American male film actors
Pennsylvania State University alumni
American male stage actors
20th-century American male actors